Damián Alejandro Manso (born 6 June 1979) is an Argentine professional footballer who plays as an attacking midfielder. Manso is a free kick specialist also can plays as a left midfielder, making known this facet during the period of Edgardo Bauza in 2008, when won the Copa Libertadores title under Bauza's orders as coach. He also has played at Europe in two opportunities at French side Bastia and Skoda Xanthi of the Greece Super League, began his career at professional hometown club Newell's Old Boys, where he won a league title in 2004.

Career

Early career
He started his soccer career at 16 in 1996 with Newell's Old Boys in a game against Boca Juniors. Despite playing for several other teams, Manso returned to play for Newell's Old Boys several times during his career and was a member of that team for nine years of his career.

LDU Quito
Manso joined the Quito based club in mid-2007 from Skoda Xanthi. He established himself as a very capable play-maker in the latter half of the season, helping his team earn their 9th national title that same season and a berth in the 2008 Copa Libertadores

In 2008, Manso further enhanced his reputation as a play-maker while playing in the 2008 Copa Libertadores. He scored key goals and created important plays which helped LDU Quito win the tournament for the first time. LDU Quito therefore became the first and only team from Ecuador to ever win this prestigious trophy. Due to his skills, he was voted as part of the ideal Copa Libertadores team, along with fellow playmates, Enrique Vera, and Joffre Guerrón. At the 2008 FIFA Club World Cup, he again was vital to the team, helping LDU Quito advance to the final against Manchester United, which they lost. Manso was awarded the Bronze Ball for his performance in the tournament.

Al Nassr
Manso went to Al Nassr FC in Asia where he left his old team Liga de Quito.

Deportivo Cuenca
On 6 January 2013, Manso signed for Ecuadorian club Deportivo Cuenca.

Newell's Old Boys
Manso resigned for his boyhood club on 22 July 2013, however only managing to play 4 games with all his appearances being made as a substitute.

Chacarita Juniors
On 30 June 2014, Manso signed for Chacarita Juniors. In 2016 his side finished runner's up in the Primera B Nacional.

Honors

Club
Newell's Old Boys
 Torneo de Apertura: 2004

LDU Quito
 Ecuadorian Serie A: 2007
 Copa Libertadores: 2008

Pachuca
 CONCACAF Champions League: 2009–10

Individual
 FIFA Club World Cup Bronze Ball: 2008

References

External links
 
 BDFA profile  
 
 
 Statistics at Guardian's Stats Centre
 Argentine Primera statistics at Fútbol XXI  
 Ecuador statistics 
 

1979 births
Living people
Footballers from Rosario, Santa Fe
Association football midfielders
Argentine footballers
Argentine expatriate footballers
Argentine Primera División players
Newell's Old Boys footballers
Club Atlético Independiente footballers
SC Bastia players
Ligue 1 players
Expatriate footballers in France
Super League Greece players
Xanthi F.C. players
L.D.U. Quito footballers
Liga MX players
C.F. Pachuca players
Chiapas F.C. footballers
Atlético Morelia players
Al Nassr FC players
C.D. Cuenca footballers
Chacarita Juniors footballers
Expatriate footballers in Ecuador
Expatriate footballers in Mexico
Expatriate footballers in Greece
Argentine expatriate sportspeople in France
Argentine expatriate sportspeople in Greece
Argentine expatriate sportspeople in Mexico
Expatriate footballers in Saudi Arabia
Saudi Professional League players
Argentine expatriate sportspeople in Saudi Arabia